Lagrotta is a Hispanic surname. Notable people with the surname include:

Blanca Lagrotta (1921–1978), Argentine actress 
Carlos Lagrotta, Argentine actor
Frank LaGrotta (born 1958), American politician 

Spanish-language surnames